Too Many Millions (1934) is a British comedy drama film directed by Harold Young and starring Betty Compton, John Garrick and Viola Keats.

Premise
In an attempt to attract the attention of the artist she loves a wealthy woman assumes the disguise of a maid.

Cast
 Betty Compton - Anne
 John Garrick - Bill
 Viola Keats - Viola
 Athole Stewart - Mr Olcott
 James Carew - Mr Worthing
 Martita Hunt - Mrs Pilcher
 Phyllis Stanley - Tamara
 Sybil Grove - Mrs Runcorn

References

External links

1934 films
1934 comedy-drama films
Films directed by Harold Young (director)
British comedy-drama films
British black-and-white films
1930s English-language films
1930s British films